

List of representatives
Ichiro Nakagawa, Liberal Democratic Party、1963・1967・1969・1972・1976・1979・1980
Shoichi Nakagawa, Liberal Democratic Party、1983・1986・1990・1993
Muneo Suzuki, independent then Liberal Democratic Party, 1983・1986・1990・1993

Election results
1993 Japanese general election
Shoichi Nakagawa, Liberal Democratic Party, 110,832 votes
Muneo Suzuki, Liberal Democratic Party, 85,201 votes
Japanese Communist Party, 26,136 votes
1990 Japanese general election
Shoichi Nakagawa, Liberal Democratic Party, 110,781 votes
Muneo Suzuki, Liberal Democratic Party, 89,654 votes
Japanese Communist Party, 26,335 votes
1986 Japanese general election
Shoichi Nakagawa, Liberal Democratic Party, 118,149 votes
Muneo Suzuki, Liberal Democratic Party, 93,835 votes
Japanese Communist Party, 20,914 votes
1983 Japanese general election
Shoichi Nakagawa, Liberal Democratic Party, 163,755 votes
Muneo Suzuki, independent, 67,436 votes
Japanese Communist Party, 20,478 votes
1980 Japanese general election
Ichiro Nakagawa, Liberal Democratic Party
1979 Japanese general election
Ichiro Nakagawa, Liberal Democratic Party
1976 Japanese general election
Ichiro Nakagawa, Liberal Democratic Party
1972 Japanese general election
Ichiro Nakagawa, Liberal Democratic Party
1969 Japanese general election
Ichiro Nakagawa, Liberal Democratic Party
1967 Japanese general election
Ichiro Nakagawa, Liberal Democratic Party
1963 Japanese general election
Ichiro Nakagawa, Liberal Democratic Party

Politics of Hokkaido
History of Hokkaido
Districts of the House of Representatives (Japan)